The Periyanayagi Ammam Temple is situated in the center of Devikapuram village, located in Tamil Nadu, India. This temple is built by the Vijayanagara Emperor in the 14th century. This is the second-largest temple of the Thiruvannamalai district after Tiruvannamalai Arunachaleswarar Temple.

References

Hindu temples in Tiruvannamalai district